The Saquia el-Hamra ( lit. The wadi continues west, passing close to Haouza and Smara before joining with the intermittent Oued el Khatt just south of Laayoune on the Atlantic coast. The wadi gives its name to the Saquia el-Hamra region.

In February 2016 astronauts aboard the International Space Station photographed the area around Laayoune, with Saquia el-Hamra river clearly visible.

References

Rivers of Western Sahara
Wadis